This list comprises all players who have participated in at least one league match for Reading United (formerly Reading Rage) in the USL Premier Development League since the USL began keeping detailed records in 2003. Players who were on the roster but never played a first team game are not listed; players who appeared for the team in other competitions (US Open Cup, etc.) but never actually made an USL appearance are noted at the bottom of the page where appropriate.

A "*" denotes players who are known to have appeared for the team prior to 2003.

B
  Art Bartholomew
  Andrew Bell
  Marc Benson
  Travis Berger
  Gabe Bernstein
  Nick Bibbs
  Joshua Bienenfeld
  Derek Black
  James Bradley
  Craig Bruths
  Peter Bulat
  Tyrell Burgess
  Brendan Burke
  Jared Burke

C
  Marcus Cabralis
  Jeffrey Chambers
  Jorge Chapay
  Nicholas Chrisanthon
  Ian Clair
  Adam Clay
  Jared Clugston
  Kevin Coleman
  Michael Colozzi
  James Connor
  Omar Cooke
  Patrick Cucci

D
  Sean Davies
  Kapil Davis
  Robert Davis
  Fred DeGand *
  Eric Detzel
  Kris Devaux
  Brian Devlin
  Alex Dixon

E
  Zach Eddinger
  Adam Edwards
  Gregory Ermold

F
  Jimmy Feimster
  Mike Feniger
  Liam Fitzwater
  Evans Frimpong

G
  Raymon Gaddis
  Paul Gallagher
  Adam Gazda
  Scott Goodwin
  John Graham
  David Gray
  Bogdan Grechka
  Tommy Greenwalt
  Danny Gring
  Helio Guimaraes Junior

H
  Adam Hay
  Matthew Hedges
  Ian Hennessy*
  Corey Hertzog
  Gary Higgins
  Dane Hodge
  David Hodgson
  Stephen Hogan
  David Horst
  Levi Houapeu
  Prisco Houndanon

K
  Phil Karn
  Eric Kleiman
  Devon Klipp
  Jeffrey Koegel
  Eric Kolar
  Scott Krotee
  Austin Kulp
  Eric Kvello *

L
  Robert Lockwood
  Calvert Louden
  Les Lunsford

M
  Connor Maloney
  Adam Marcellus
  Matthew Marcin
  Richard Marquetty
  Ian McCarty
  Scott McDowell
  Daine Merrin
  Barkley Miller
  Jonathan Miller
  Brandon Moncrief
  Richard Mucelli
  Luke Mulholland
  Devin Muntz
  Mark Murphy
  Martin Murphy

N
  Richard Namulala
  Kurt Nusshag
  Philip Nuzzi
  Jonathan Nydell

O
  Felix Obilo
  Alan O'Connor
  Darren O'Connor
  Simon Omekanda

P
  Andrew Parr
  Eric Parrish
  Geoff Pezon
  Gregory Pompei
  Anthony Ponikvar
  Jon Ports
  Eric Puls

Q
  Ged Quinn

R
  Aleksandar Radovic
  Jack Reid
  Stephen Reihner
  Ryan Roberts
  Xavier Rock
  Peter Rowley
  Scott Rowling

S
  Charlie Sales
  Joshua Sanders
  C. J. Sapong
  Eric Schoenle
  Jesse Schram
  Billy Schuler
  Chad Severs
  Matthew Shealer
  Pete Shellenberger
  Greg Sherwood
  James Shupp
  James Shuptar
  Dawyne Smith
  Patrick Stanco
  Patrick Starsinic
  Tyler Stoviak
  Kevin Strunk

T
  Thomas Talarico
  James Taranto
  Roy Thompson

U
  Baris Uslu

V
  Zarek Valentin
  Mario Vila Boa
  Daniel Visser
  Jeremy Vuolo

W
  David Walters
  Michael Watkins
  Adam Welch
  James Wenger
  Alexander Wentzel
  Chris Whalley
  Aaron Wheeler
  Jonathon Williamson
  Wickerham Greg
  Buddy Wirtz
  Tyler Witmer
  Matthew Wood

Y
  Jason Yeisley
  David Young

Z
  Joe Zewe

Sources

2010 Reading United stats
2009 Reading Rage stats
2008 Reading Rage stats
2007 Reading Rage stats
2006 Reading Rage stats
2005 Reading Rage stats

References

Reading United A.C.
 
Association football player non-biographical articles